

The St. Zacharie, Maine – St. Zacharie, Quebec border crossing on the Canada–US border is one of four in the Maine Highlands. Two miles south of Little Saint John Lake, it is the westernmost crossing used primarily by people and vehicles involved in logging the forests in the North Maine Woods. Canada does not inspect vehicles entering from Maine at this location. Golden Road, and the roads that connect to it were developed by the Great Northern Paper Company to support its logging operations.

See also
 List of Mexico–United States border crossings
 List of Canada–United States border crossings

References

1972 establishments in Maine
1972 establishments in Quebec
Canada–United States border crossings
Chaudière-Appalaches
Geography of Somerset County, Maine
Transportation buildings and structures in Somerset County, Maine